In the mathematical subject of group theory, a one-relator group is a group given by a group presentation with a single defining relation. One-relator groups play an important role in geometric group theory by providing many explicit examples of finitely presented groups.

Formal definition

A one-relator group is a group G that admits a group presentation of the form

where X is a set (in general possibly infinite), and where  is a freely and cyclically reduced word.

If Y is the set of all letters  that appear in r and  then 

where  for some integer

Freiheitssatz

Let G be a one-relator group given by presentation above. Recall that r is a freely and cyclically reduced word in F(X). Let  be a letter such that  or  appears in r. Let . The subgroup  is called a Magnus subgroup of G. 

See also for other proofs.

Properties of one-relator groups

Here we assume that a one-relator group G is given by presentation with a finite generating set  and a nontrivial freely and cyclically reduced defining relation .

A one-relator group G is torsion-free if and only if  is not a proper power.

 Every one-relator group G  is virtually torsion-free, that is, admits a torsion-free subgroup of finite index.

A one-relator presentation is diagrammatically aspherical.

If  is not a proper power then the presentation complex P for presentation is a finite Eilenberg–MacLane complex . 

If  is not a proper power then a one-relator group G  has cohomological dimension .

 A one-relator group G is free if and only if  is a primitive element; in this case G is free of rank n − 1.

Then the group G is  freely indecomposable.

If  is not a proper power then a one-relator group G  is locally indicable, that is, every nontrivial finitely generated subgroup of G admits a group homomorphism onto .

Every one-relator group G has algorithmically decidable word problem.

 It is unknown if one-relator groups have solvable conjugacy problem.

 It is unknown if the isomorphism problem is decidable for the class of one-relator groups.

 A one-relator group G given by presentation has rank n (that is, it cannot be generated by fewer than n elements) unless  is a primitive element.

 Let G be a one-relator group given by presentation. If  then the center of G is trivial, . If  and G is non-abelian with non-trivial center, then the center of G is infinite cyclic.

 Let  where . Let  and  be the normal closures of r and s in F(X) accordingly.

There exists a finitely generated one-relator group that is not Hopfian and therefore not residually finite, for example the Baumslag–Solitar group .

 Let G be a one-relator group given by presentation. Then G satisfies the following version of the Tits alternative. If G is torsion-free then every subgroup of G either contains a free group of rank 2 or is solvable. If G has nontrivial torsion, then every subgroup of G either contains a free group of rank 2, or is cyclic, or is infinite dihedral.

 Let G be a one-relator group given by presentation. Then the normal subgroup  admits a free basis of the form  for some family of elements .

One-relator groups with torsion

Suppose a one-relator group G given by presentation where  where  and where  is not a proper power (and thus s is also freely and cyclically reduced). Then the following hold:

 The element s has order m in G, and every element of finite order in G is conjugate to a power of s.

 G admits a torsion-free normal subgroup of finite index.

Since  that means that  and presentation of G is a Dehn presentation.

 G has virtual cohomological dimension  .

 G is a word-hyperbolic group.

 G has decidable conjugacy problem.

 G is coherent, that is every finitely generated subgroup of G is finitely presentable.

 The isomorphism problem is decidable for finitely generated one-relator groups with torsion, by virtue of their hyperbolicity.

 G is residually finite.

Magnus–Moldavansky method

Starting with the work of Magnus in the 1930s, most general results about one-relator groups are proved by induction on the length |r| of the defining relator r. 
The presentation below follows Section 6 of Chapter II of Lyndon and Schupp and Section 4.4 of Magnus, Karrass and Solitar for Magnus' original approach and Section 5 of Chapter IV of Lyndon and Schupp for the Moldavansky's HNN-extension version of that approach.

Let G be a one-relator group given by presentation with a finite generating set X. Assume also that every generator from X actually occurs in r.

One can usually assume that  (since otherwise G is cyclic and whatever statement is being proved about G is usually obvious). 

The main case to consider when some generator, say t, from X occurs in r with exponent sum 0 on t. Say  in this case. For every generator  one denotes  where .

For example, if  then .

Magnus observed that the subgroup  is itself a one-relator group with the one-relator presentation . Note that since , one can usually apply the inductive hypothesis to  when proving a particular statement about G.

Magnus' original approach exploited the fact that N is actually an iterated amalgamated product of the groups , amalgamated along suitably chosen Magnus free subgroups. His proof of Freiheitssatz and of the solution of the word problem for one-relator groups was based on this approach.

Later Moldavansky simplified the framework and noted that in this case G itself is an HNN-extension of L with associated subgroups being Magnus free subgroups of L.

Moldavansky observed that in this situation 

is an HNN-extension of L. This fact often allows proving something about G using the inductive hypothesis about the one-relator group L via the use of normal form methods and structural algebraic properties for the HNN-extension G.

The general case, both in Magnus' original setting and in Moldavansky's simplification of it, requires treating the situation where no generator from X occurs with exponent sum 0 in r. Suppose that distinct letters  occur in r with nonzero exponents  accordingly. The map f induces a group homomorphism  that turns out to be an embedding.
The one-relator group G can then be treated using Moldavansky's approach. When  splits as an HNN-extension of a one-relator group L, the defining relator  of L still turns out to be shorter than r, allowing for inductive arguments to proceed. Magnus' original approach used a similar version of an embedding trick for dealing with this case.

Two-generator one-relator groups

It turns out that many two-generator one-relator groups split as semidirect products . This fact was observed by Ken Brown when analyzing the BNS-invariant of one-relator groups using the Magnus-Moldavansky method.

where  is a freely and cyclically reduced word.

Since , the exponent sum on t in r is equal to 0.
Therefore if  is an epimorphism with a finitely generated kernel, then G splits as  where  is a finite rank free group. 

for all sufficiently large n.

Examples of one-relator groups

 Free abelian group  

 Baumslag–Solitar group  where .

 Torus knot group  where  are coprime integers.

 Baumslag–Gersten group 

 Oriented surface group  where  and where .

 Non-oriented surface group , where .

Generalizations and open problems

Klyachko proved the Kervaire conjecture for the case where A is torsion-free.

A conjecture attributed to Gersten says that a finitely generated one-relator group is word-hyperbolic if and only if it contains no Baumslag–Solitar subgroups.

Baumslag, with co-authors, showed that in many cases, by a suitable choice of H'' and  one can prove that that  is actually free (of infinite rank). These results led to a conjecture that every finitely generated one-relator group with torsion is virtually free-by-cyclic.

See also

3-manifolds
Geometric topology
Small cancellation theory

Sources

 Wilhelm Magnus, Abraham Karrass, Donald Solitar, Combinatorial group theory. Presentations of groups in terms of generators and relations, Reprint of the 1976 second edition, Dover Publications, Inc., Mineola, NY, 2004. .

References

External links
Andrew Putman's notes on one-relator groups, University of Notre Dame

Group theory
Algebraic topology
Algebra
Geometric topology